Marin (French) or Marín (Spanish "sailor") may refer to:

People
 Marin (name), including a list of persons with the given name or surname
 MaRin, in-game name of professional South Korean League of Legends player Jang Gyeong-hwan (born 1991)

Places

U.S.
 Marin City, California
 Marin County, California
 Marin Creek, California
 Marin Headlands, California
 Marin Hills, in southern Marin County, California
 Marin Islands, California
 Marin, California, former name of Point Reyes Station, California

Elsewhere
 Le Marin, a commune in the French overseas department of Martinique
 Marin, Haute-Savoie, a commune in France
 Marin, Iran, a village in Kohgiluyeh and Boyer-Ahmad Province, Iran
 Marín, Nuevo León, a town and municipality in Mexico
 Marín, Pontevedra, a municipality in Galicia, Spain
 Marin, a village in Crasna Commune, Sălaj County, Romania
 Marin Rural Municipality, a municipality in Bagmati Province, Nepal

Other uses
 Marin (wind), a type of wind in France
 Marin Bikes, bicycle manufacturer based in California
 Marin Boulevard, Hudson County, New Jersey
 Maritime Research Institute Netherlands, an oceanographic institute
 College of Marin, a community college in Marin County, California
 2K Marin, American and Australian video game developer
 "Marin", French language version title of the song "Sailor"

See also
 Marina
 Marine (disambiguation)
 Marini, a surname
 Marino (disambiguation)
 Marrin (disambiguation)
 Marins
 Saint Marinus (died 366), founder of San Marino